John Hazen may refer to:

 John Douglas Hazen, politician in New Brunswick, Canada
 John Hazen (basketball), American basketball player